Kerry Hoole (born 11 June 1940) is a former Australian racing cyclist. He won the Australian national road race title in 1966 and 1973.

Hoole set the fastest time in the Goulburn to Sydney Classic 5 times, 1965–1968 and 1972 run in reverse direction from Milperra to Goulburn.

References

External links

1940 births
Living people
Australian male cyclists
People from Goulburn
Cyclists from New South Wales